Wadouba is a commune in the Cercle of Bandigara of the Mopti Region of Mali. The commune contains 46 small villages and in the 2009 census had a population of 28,101. The administrative centre (chef-lieu) is the village of Kani Gogouna.

References

External links
.
.

Communes of Mopti Region